The 2014 Tennessee gubernatorial election took place on November 4, 2014, to elect the governor of Tennessee. Incumbent Republican Governor Bill Haslam won re-election to a second term with over 70% of the vote. As of recently, this was the best performance in a Tennessee gubernatorial election since Buford Ellington's victory in 1966.

Haslam, who was first elected over Mike McWherter in 2010, defeated the Democratic candidate Charles Brown in a landslide, carrying every county in the state.

Republican primary

Candidates

Declared
 Mark "Coonrippy" Brown
 Bill Haslam, incumbent Governor
 Basil Marceaux, perennial candidate
 Donald McFolin, Independent candidate for Governor in 2010

Declined
 John Jay Hooker, political gadfly and Democratic nominee for governor in 1970 and 1998 (running as an independent)

Results

Democratic primary

Candidates

Declared
 Charles V. Brown, retired engineer and candidate for governor in 2002
 Kennedy Spellman Johnson
 John McKamey, former Sullivan County Commissioner
 Ron Noonan

Removed from ballot
 Mark E. Clayton, Vice President of Public Advocate of the United States and nominee for U.S. Senate in 2012
 Jesse Gore
 Ed Borum

Declined
 Lowe Finney, state senator
 Craig Fitzhugh, minority leader of the Tennessee House of Representatives
 Roy Herron, chairman of the Tennessee Democratic Party, former state senator and nominee for Tennessee's 8th congressional district in 2010
 John Jay Hooker, political gadfly and nominee for governor in 1970 and 1998 (running as an Independent)
 Jim Kyle, state senator and candidate for governor in 2010
 Sara Kyle, former director of the Tennessee Regulatory Authority
 Mike McWherter, businessman, attorney and nominee for governor in 2010

Results

Independents and Third Parties

Candidates

Declared
 Steven Coburn (Independent)
 Shaun Crowell (Constitution)
 John Jay Hooker (Independent), political gadfly and Democratic nominee for governor in 1970 and 1998
 Isa Infante (Green)
 Daniel T. Lewis (Libertarian), educator and nominee for the U.S. Senate in 2008

Removed from ballot
 Jondavid Balunek (Independent)
 J. D. Ellis (Independent)

General election

Predictions

Polling

Results

References

External links
 Tennessee gubernatorial election, 2014 at Ballotpedia

Official campaign websites (Archived)
 Bill Haslam for Governor incumbent
 Charlie Brown for Governor
 Basil Marceaux for Governor
 John McKamey for Governor

2014 Tennessee elections
2014
2014 United States gubernatorial elections